Mount Hay is the name of several mountains:

Mount Hay (Antarctica)
Mount Hay (New South Wales), Australia
Mount Hay (Queensland), Australia
Mount Hay (Yakutat), Canada-US border peak, on the border of British Columbia and Alaska
Mount Hay (Ethiopia)
Mount Hay (New Zealand), in the Canterbury Region of the South Island

See also
Hay Peak, South Georgia Island
 Mount Hayes, Alaska